The Namibia national cricket team toured Kenya in November 2002 and played six matches against Kenya. The touring Namibian team was captained by Deon Kotzé.

Matches

References

2002 in Namibian sport
2002 in Kenyan cricket